The 24 January 2011 Iraq bombings were a series of four explosions, two in Baghdad and two in Karbala, which killed at least 27 people and wounded at least 78 more.

Two blasts, caused by roadside bombs, occurred in the Iraqi capital Baghdad, the first of which killed two people including an Iraqi brigadier general. The second explosion caused at least eight injuries.

In Karbala, where Shia pilgrims were marking Arba'een, two car bombs detonated a few hours apart. The first bomb targeted a bus terminal to the east of Karbala and killed seven people, injuring more than double that, while the second hit south of the city and claimed 18 lives.

The attacks came the week after the January 2011 Iraq suicide attacks, which killed at least 133 people including 56 in Karbala. The attacks were located near the blasts that occurred on 20 January, and have been blamed on the delay in naming Iraq's new defence and interior ministers.

Several theories arose as a result of the attacks, including that the attacks could be the work of Saddam Hussein's former Ba'ath Party members, or that they were an attempt to reduce confidence in the security arrangements for an Arab League summit in March.

See also

January 2011 Iraq suicide attacks

References

2011 murders in Iraq
21st-century mass murder in Iraq
Car and truck bombings in Iraq
Islamic terrorist incidents in 2012
January 2011 events in Iraq
Mass murder in 2011
Terrorist incidents in Iraq in 2011
Terrorist incidents in Baghdad
Violence against Shia Muslims in Iraq